Sir Thomas Hanmer, 4th Baronet (1677–1746) was Speaker of the House of Commons, MP for Flint 1701–1702, Flintshire 1702–1705, Thetford 1705–1708 and Suffolk 1708–1727.

Thomas Hanmer may also refer to:
Thomas Hanmer (died 1583), MP for Flintshire (UK Parliament constituency)
Thomas Hanmer (died c.1619), MP for Flintshire (UK Parliament constituency)
Sir Thomas Hanmer, 2nd Baronet (1612–1678), Member of Parliament (MP) for Flint 1640 and Flintshire 1669–1678
 Thomas Hanmer (died 1701) (c. 1648–1701), MP for Ludlow 1690–1691
Sir Thomas Hanmer, 2nd Baronet (2nd creation) (1747–1828), Welsh baronet and MP for Flintshire and Flint Boroughs
 Thomas Hanmer (died 1737) (c. 1702–1737), MP for Castle Rising 1734–1737